Gene isoforms are mRNAs that are produced from the same locus but are different in their transcription start sites (TSSs), protein coding DNA sequences (CDSs) and/or untranslated regions (UTRs), potentially altering gene function.

Cis-regulatory elements in the promoter contain sequences recognized by transcription factors and the basal transcription machinery. So the location of the TSS is important for understanding the biogenesis of specific isoforms. The idea that different binding partners confer different functional properties has been well studied in tissue-specific gene regulation. For example, the same transcription factor (TF) can direct gene expression in different tissues simply by binding with different TSSs in each tissue. Isoforms harboring changes in the CDS have been the most thoroughly characterized because they commonly give rise to proteins with different functional properties. UTRs regulate the levels of primary transcript in numerous ways: transcript stability, folding and turnover, as well as translation efficiency. UTRs are often the target of miRNA, which typically downregulate transcript expression by triggering degradation or halting translation.

The gene isoforms can be sequenced by Whole Transcriptome Shotgun Sequencing (RNA-Seq). Recently some progress has been made to characterize known isoforms of regeneration associated genes (RAGs) using RNA-Seq, which is important in understanding the isoform diversity in the CNS.

Examples

ATF3 
Activating transcription factor 3 (Atf3) is a known RAG with numerous promoters. Atf3 expression increases after nerve injury and overexpression of a constitutively active form of Atf3 increases the rate of peripheral nerve regeneration.  Four Atf3 isoforms were identified in dorsal root ganglia (DRG) so far. These four isoforms differ in TSS, and one differs in the CDS. However it is unclear which promoters are in use in regenerating DRG neurons.

PTEN 
Phosphatase and tensin homolog (Pten) is originally identified as a tumor suppressor gene. Recent studies found that Pten also suppressed axon regeneration in retinal ganglion cells, corticospinal tract, and DRG neurons. So far 3 Pten isoforms (Pten, PtenJ1, and Pten J2) have been identified and analyzed. Pten J1 is identical in sequence to the conventional Pten isoform except for a difference in TSS and a small shift in the CDS. Pten J2 has a truncated CDS, an alternative transcription start site and a longer 3’ UTR compared to the conventional Pten isoform expressed within neurons. The truncated CDS encodes a protein that lacks a phosphate domain. Also, overexpression of Pten J2 and Pten in primary cortical neurons does not influence axon regeneration. So it’s hypothesized that Pten J2 works as regulatory RNA to inhibit the activity of Pten.

See also
 Protein isoform

References

RNA